Simone Bernardini (born 6 September 1991) is an Italian former racing cyclist. He competed in the men's team time trial event at the 2017 UCI Road World Championships.

References

External links

1991 births
Living people
Italian male cyclists
Place of birth missing (living people)